is a professional Japanese baseball player. He plays pitcher for the Chunichi Dragons.

On 20 October 2017, Ishikawa was selected as the 2nd draft pick for the Chunichi Dragons at the 2017 NPB Draft and on 10 November signed a provisional contract with a ¥60,000,000 sign-on bonus and a ¥7,000,000 yearly salary.

Ishikawa's mother is Filipino and his father is Japanese.
As a boy, Ishikawa liked watching former Yokohama DeNA BayStars fireballer Marc Kroon as well as Hanshin Tigers fireman, Kyuji Fujikawa. He admires Yomiuri Giants ace, Tomoyuki Sugano as well as former Giants star Suguru Egawa.

References

1999 births
Living people
Baseball people from Tokyo
Japanese baseball players
Nippon Professional Baseball pitchers
Chunichi Dragons players
People from Itabashi